Janne Henrik Väätäinen (born March 6, 1975 in Kuopio) is a Finnish former ski jumper who competed from 1992 to 2001. At the 1994 Winter Olympics in Lillehammer, he finished fifth in the team large hill and 30th in the individual normal hill events.

Väätäinen's best finish at the Ski-flying World Championships was 14th at Planica in 1994. His best World Cup career finish was third in an individual normal hill event in Finland in 1996.

External links

1975 births
Living people
People from Kuopio
Ski jumpers at the 1994 Winter Olympics
Finnish male ski jumpers
Sportspeople from North Savo
20th-century Finnish people